Neville Sayers (19 January 1927 – 4 October 2018) was an Australian modern pentathlete and sports shooter. He competed at the modern pentathlon at the 1956 and 1960 Summer Olympics and the shooting at the 1960 Games.

References

External links
 
 Neville Sayers at Melbourne International Shooting Club website

1927 births
2018 deaths
Australian male modern pentathletes
Australian male sport shooters
Olympic modern pentathletes of Australia
Olympic shooters of Australia
Modern pentathletes at the 1956 Summer Olympics
Modern pentathletes at the 1960 Summer Olympics
Shooters at the 1960 Summer Olympics
Sportspeople from Melbourne
20th-century Australian people
21st-century Australian people